Linzey Louise Cocker (born 19 May 1987) is an English actress best known for playing Jade Webb in the BBC Three comedy-drama series Drop Dead Gorgeous, Josie in the 2008 film Wild Child, and Jess Fisher in Waterloo Road.

Linzey has two children, born in 2011 and 2021, and is engaged to Ex Professional Footballer for South China, Adam Chi Keung Tse.

Early years
Cocker went to Wentworth High School (now Ellesmere Park High School) in Eccles, Greater Manchester.

Career

In Drop Dead Gorgeous, Cocker's character is the fraternal twin of Ashley Webb. Jade, being the popular and charismatic sister, finds it difficult to adjust to her shy sister's rapid success as a model, when Jade has always wanted to be a model herself so when her sister was offered a modeling job it changed their family's life and most of all Jade's life.

She also appeared in the films Wild Child along with actress Emma Roberts and Enemies Closer alongside Jean-Claude Van Damme.

Cocker also performed in a BBC drama series, Waterloo Road, playing new pupil Jess Fisher, alongside former Silent Witness actress Amanda Burton who plays her on-screen mother and new headteacher, Karen Fisher.

Cocker also played Sam Swan in a BBC comedy drama White Gold.

In 2016, she played the role of Marie in the BBC One drama series Our Girl, where she played the role of Georgie Lane's sister and later the wife/widow of Fingers. She played the role until series end in 2020.

Filmography

References

External links

1988 births
Living people
English film actresses
English television actresses
Actresses from Salford
Association footballers' wives and girlfriends
21st-century English actresses